Dunn is the largest city of Harnett County, North Carolina, United States. The population was 9,263 at the 2010 census, and an estimated 9,718 in 2018. It is the anchor city of the Dunn Micropolitan Area, population 114,678 (2010 census), which consists of Harnett County and is a part of the greater Raleigh–Durham–Cary Combined Statistical Area (CSA) as defined by the United States Census Bureau.

History
Originally called "Lucknow", what would become present-day Dunn was a sleepy hamlet compared to Averasborough, a much larger city on the Cape Fear River. After the Battle of Averasborough in 1865, most residents from Averasborough left for Lucknow, renamed "Dunn" in 1873.

The city of Dunn was incorporated on February 12, 1887, at which time it was a logging town and a turpentine distilling center. The name honors Bennett Dunn, who supervised the construction of the railway line between Wilson and Fayetteville.

The Dunn Commercial Historic District, Harnett County Training School, Kenneth L. Howard House, Lebanon, Gen. William C. Lee House, John A. McKay House and Manufacturing Company, and John E. Wilson House are listed on the National Register of Historic Places.

The city's former mayor, Oscar Harris, died when walking around the city. He was 80.

Geography
Dunn is located in eastern Harnett County at  (35.310360, -78.610836). It is bordered to the west by the town of Erwin. U.S. Route 301 (Clinton Avenue) passes through the center of Dunn, leading northeast  to Benson and southwest  to Fayetteville. U.S. Route 421 (Cumberland Street) crosses US-301 in the center of Dunn, leading northwest through Erwin  to Lillington, the county seat, and southeast  to Clinton. Interstate 95 passes through the eastern side of Dunn, with access from Exits 72 and 73. I-95 leads northeast  to the Wilson area and southwest to the Fayetteville area.

Demographics

2020 census

As of the 2020 United States census, there were 8,446 people, 4,031 households, and 2,284 families residing in the city.

2000 census
As of the census of 2000, there were 9,196 people, 3,797 households, and 2,422 families residing in the city. The population density was 1,482.2 people per square mile (572.7/km2). There were 4,100 housing units at an average density of 660.8 per square mile (255.3/km2). The racial makeup of the city was 54.56% White, 41.21% African American, 0.97% Native American, 0.60% Asian, 0.07% Pacific Islander, 1.28% from other races, and 1.32% from two or more races. Hispanic or Latino of any race were 2.24% of the population.

There were 3,797 households, out of which 27.7% had children under the age of 18 living with them, 40.6% were married couples living together, 19.8% had a female householder with no husband present, and 36.2% were non-families. 32.7% of all households were made up of individuals, and 15.9% had someone living alone who was 65 years of age or older. The average household size was 2.35 and the average family size was 2.99.

In the city, the population was spread out, with 25.1% under the age of 18, 7.8% from 18 to 24, 25.3% from 25 to 44, 23.5% from 45 to 64, and 18.4% who were 65 years of age or older. The median age was 39 years. For every 100 females, there were 79.9 males. For every 100 females age 18 and over, there were 74.2 males.

The median income for a household in the city was $28,550, and the median income for a family was $39,521. Males had a median income of $31,029 versus $21,961 for females. The per capita income for the city was $19,178. About 19.6% of families and 23.5% of the population were below the poverty line, including 32.2% of those under age 18 and 19.2% of those age 65 or over.

Education
Dunn is home to four schools. Dunn Elementary is for preschool through third grade; Wayne Avenue Elementary serves fourth and fifth grade students; Dunn Middle School is for grades six through eight. Dunn's students then attend Triton High School in nearby Erwin.

Dunn is also home to private religious schools, including Dream Big Christian Academy, Calvary Christian Academy, Heritage Bible College, and Foundations Bible College and Theological Seminary.

School paddling controversy

In December 1981, three students at Dunn High School were spanked with a wooden paddle by the assistant principal, Glenn Varney, as punishment for skipping school. School corporal punishment is legal in the state of North Carolina and was at the time permitted by the Harnett County school district. The paddling led the parents of one of the students, 17-year-old Shelly Gaspersohn, to file a $55,000 lawsuit against Varney and the school the following May (Gaspersohn v. Harnett County Board of Education), claiming that the punishment was too severe. When Shelley reached the age of 18 in October, she took over as direct plaintiff. In December 1983, following one week of testimony and 15 minutes of deliberation, the jury found for the defendants, and the plaintiff's subsequent appeal was ultimately rejected two years later by the Supreme Court of North Carolina. The trial was chronicled by psychologist Irwin Hyman, who was a witness for the plaintiff, in his 1990 book, Reading, Writing and the Hickory Stick.

On October 17, 1984, Shelly Gaspersohn recounted her experience before the U.S. Senate Subcommittee on Juvenile Justice, led by the subcommittee chairman, Arlen Specter of Pennsylvania. She stated that the county medical examiner who treated her for bruises and external hemorrhaging in the days after she was paddled filed a child abuse charge against Varney (a fact that was not allowed to be presented at trial), but that "there is no agency that can investigate a charge of child abuse against a public school teacher." Shelly's mother, Marlene Gaspersohn, also testified during the same session. When asked if she believed schools had the right to administer corporal punishment to students," Mrs. Gaspersohn replied, "I used to think that they had that right, but after experiencing the trauma that it can create, I have changed my mind completely about it."

Shelly Gaspersohn also called for the abolition of school paddling in a guest column for USA Today, published October 23, 1984.

In 2008 Harnett County changed its policy to ban corporal punishment in schools.

Notable people

 Dorothy F. Bailey, civil leader
 Kevin Barnes, NFL cornerback
 Renee Ellmers, congresswoman
 Beth Finch, politician and businesswoman
 Kenneth L. Hardison, lawyer and author
 Oscar N. Harris, politician
 Cal Lampley, record producer and composer
 William C. Lee, Army general
 David R. Lewis, former member of the North Carolina House of Representatives
 Debbi Morgan, actress
 Wilson Raynor, NFL long snapper
 James Toon, gridiron football player and coach
 Clayton White, football coach and player
 Link Wray, musician

References

External links
 City of Dunn official website
 The Daily Record
 Dunn Area Chamber of Commerce
 Dunn Area History Museum

Cities in North Carolina
Cities in Harnett County, North Carolina